DIGIC Pictures is a Hungarian 3D animation studio based in Budapest, specializing in the production of 3D animated game cinematics CGI. Digic also provides motion capture services at its own studio, Digic Motion. The company produces 3D animated shorts and visual effects in association with video games, feature films or commercial advertisements.

History
DIGIC Pictures was founded in December 2001 by Alex S. Rabb, originally creating trailers and promotional teasers for video games, as part of video game developer Black Hole Entertainment. Digic Pictures, as the cinematic department of Black Hole, produced animation sequences for RTS games developed by Black Hole. In 2002, Digic produced five 3D cinematics – Intro, Outro, Human, Beast, Fallen – for the EA game called Armies of Exigo that was completed in 2003. With Andrew G. Vajna, the studio became involved in the production of 60 VFX scenes of the American film Terminator 3: Rise of the Machines.

Since 2006, Digic Pictures has worked with video game developers while also producing animated shorts for gamer audiences, including intros, outros, trailers and teasers for Warhammer, Darksiders, Assassin's Creed, and Mass Effect episodes. The Assassin's Creed Unity trailer was introduced at E3 in 2014. In November 2014, Digic made a cinematic for Call of Duty: Advanced Warfare. In 2015, the Assassin's Creed Unity: Dead Kings, and Assassin's Creed Syndicate cinematic trailer were released. Also in 2015, the Witcher 3: Wild Hunt cinematic trailer was published. 

In 2016, Digic produced content for Destiny: The Taken King, Kingsglaive: Final Fantasy XV, and the Final Fantasy XV – Omen trailer. In 2017, DIGIC Pictures made CG trailers for League of Legends: Warwick The Wrath of Zaun, Lineage M, Gwent: The Witcher Card Game, and Assassin's Creed Origins. Besides CG trailers, Digic also created in-game CG cinematics for Destiny 2. 

Since 2021 DIGIC is a part of Embracer Group

Game cinematics

VFX & commercials

References

External links
 

Saber Interactive
Visual effects companies
Hungarian companies established in 2001
Mass media companies established in 2001
Hungarian animation studios
2021 mergers and acquisitions
Companies based in Budapest